Coptosoma scutellatum (soot sprite) is a species of true bugs belonging to the family Plataspidae, subfamily Plataspinae.

Description
Coptosoma scutellatum can reach a size of about 4–5 mm. These small true bugs are almost spherical or trapezoidal in shape and shiny deep black, sometimes with green, blue or bronze gloss. The side edges of the abdomen are yellow. The scutellum covers the abdomen and the tarsus is bipartite.

Distribution
This species can be found in most of southern Europe and it is widespread from North Africa to Siberia, China, Korea and Japan. In Europe it is missing in the British Isles.

It is one of the four European species of Coptosoma, most of other being restricted to Asia and Ethiopia.

Habitat
These thermophile bugs live in dry and warm areas with moderately dense herbaceous vegetation, in lawns, limestones, clay and sandy soils. In the Alps, it is particularly common in the valleys, but can be found in good conditions up to 1000 meters above sea level.

Biology
They mostly feed on legumes (Coronilla species, Lathyrus species) and other leguminous plants, such as alfalfa (Medicago sativa), birdsfoot trefoil (Lotus corniculatus), milkvetch (Astragalus), vetch (Vicia), Sainfoin (Onobrychis), broom (Genista) or restharrows (Ononis).

The species overwinters as larvae (in third or fourth instar) and develops in May or June into the adult insect. The adults can be observed from Summer until September. The oviposition occurs in midsummer.

Bibliography
 Ekkehard Wachmann, Albert Melber, Jürgen Deckert: Wanzen. Band 4: Pentatomomorpha II: Pentatomoidea: Cydnidae, Thyreocoridae, Plataspidae, Acanthosomatidae, Scutelleridae, Pentatomidae. Goecke & Evers, Keltern 2008, S. 28.
 Kment P. (2013): Preliminary check-list of the Heteroptera of Czech Republic
 Vilimova J., 2004 - Family Plataspididae - Catalogue of the Heteroptera of the Palaearctic Region
Ekkehard Wachmann: Wanzen beobachten – kennenlernen. Neumann-Neudamm, Melsungen 1989, S. 72
Ekkehard Wachmann:Wanzen beobachten – kennenlernen. Neumann-Neudamm, Melsungen 1989, .
Frieder Sauer: Sauers Naturführer Wanzen und Zikaden nach Farbfotos erkannt. Fauna, Keltern 1996, S. 32.

References

External links
 Boris Loboda Photos
 Alsphotopage

Hemiptera of Europe
Insects described in 1785
Articles containing video clips